The arrow dragonet (Callionymus sagitta), also known as the arrow-headed darter dragonet, is a species of dragonet widespread in the Indo-West Pacific from Arabian Peninsula to the Philippines. Occurs in the Mekong delta of Viet Nam and probably also in Cambodia.  This species grows to a length of  TL. The arrow dragonet is a demersal species, which occurs on sandy substrates along coastlines, in estuaries, and in the lower courses of rivers where it feeds on worms, zooplankton and phytoplankton.

References 

arrow dragonet
Fish of South Asia
Fish of East Asia
Fish of Southeast Asia
arrow dragonet